The Polish Helmet or Polish Krymka Tumbler is a breed of fancy pigeon, specifically a type of Helmet pigeon, that has been developed over many years of selective breeding. It is distinctive on account of its "Muffs" (large foot feathers), and is colored only on the top half of its head (the "helmet") and on its tail. It is thought to be related to the European and American pigeons, though it remains unknown as to what came first or how they spread and adapted all over the world.

References

1  https://en.wiktionary.org/wiki/mountain_chickens#English

See also 
List of pigeon breeds

Pigeon breeds